High-throughput may refer to:

 High-throughput computing, a computer science concept
 High-throughput screening, a bioinformatics concept
 High-throughput biology, a cell biology concept
 High-throughput sequencing, DNA sequencing
 Measuring data throughput, a communications concept

See also
 Throughput